Abida polyodon is a species of air-breathing land snails, a terrestrial pulmonate gastropod mollusc in the family Chondrinidae.

Geographic distribution
Abida polyodon is found in France (the Lower Rhone drainage, Massif Central, and the Eastern Pyrenees), Andorra, and Spain (most of Catalonia and the island of Menorca).

Ecology
The species can be found sheltering under stones in places with a calcareous substrate. It is also occasionally found on the surface of rocks.

References

External links
 

Chondrinidae
Gastropods of Europe
Gastropods described in 1801